Aisling Friel (born c. 1983) is a model from Glasgow. She was Mary from Dungloe in 2003 and was crowned Miss Scotland in 2005. She married football player Stephen Pearson in 2010, but in 2012 the couple separated. She is now married to Glasgow restaurateur Ryan Barrie.

References

1980s births
Living people
Association footballers' wives and girlfriends
People from Glasgow
Scottish beauty pageant winners
Scottish female models
Miss World 2005 delegates